Harry Kerr (31 August 1856 – 17 June 1936) was a Canadian sports shooter. He competed in two events at the 1908 Summer Olympics winning a bronze medal in the team military rifle event.

References

1856 births
1936 deaths
Canadian male sport shooters
Olympic shooters of Canada
Shooters at the 1908 Summer Olympics
People from Ovingham
Sportspeople from Northumberland
Olympic bronze medalists for Canada
Olympic medalists in shooting
Medalists at the 1908 Summer Olympics
20th-century Canadian people